English studies (usually called simply English) is an academic discipline taught in primary, secondary, and post-secondary education in English-speaking countries; it is not to be confused with English taught as a foreign language, which is a distinct discipline. An expert on English studies can be called an Anglicist. The discipline involves the study and exploration of texts created in English literature. English studies include: the study of literature (especially novels, plays, short stories, and poetry), the majority of which comes from Britain, the United States, and Ireland (although English-language literature from any country may be studied, and local or national literature is usually emphasized in any given country); English composition, including writing essays, short stories, and poetry; English language arts, including the study of grammar, usage, and style; and English sociolinguistics, including discourse analysis of written and spoken texts in the English language, the history of the English language, English language learning and teaching, and the study of World of English. English linguistics (syntax, morphology, phonetics, phonology, etc.) is usually treated as a distinct discipline, taught in a department of linguistics.

The disciplinary divide between a dominant literature or usage orientation is one motivation for the division of the North American Modern Language Association (MLA) into two subgroups. At universities in non-English-speaking countries, the same department often covers all aspects of English studies, including linguistics: this is reflected, for example, in the structure and activities of the European Society for the Study of English (ESSE).

It is common for departments of English to offer courses and scholarships in the areas of the English language, literature (including literary criticism and literary theory), public speaking and speech-writing, rhetoric, composition studies, creative writing, philology and etymology, journalism, poetry, publishing, literacy, area studies (especially American studies), the philosophy of language, theater and play-writing, screenwriting, communication studies, technical communication, cultural studies, critical theory, gender studies, ethnic studies, disability studies, digital media and electronic publishing, film studies and other media studies, and various courses in the liberal arts and humanities, among others. In most English-speaking countries, the study at all educational levels of texts produced in non-English languages takes place in other departments, such as departments of foreign language or of comparative literature.

Fields

See also Literature and linguistics, along with List of academic disciplines 
 English linguistics
 English sociolinguistics
 Discourse analysis in English
 English Stylistics (linguistics)
 The World of English
 History of the English language
 Composition studies
 Rhetoric
 Technical communication
 English language learning and teaching
 English literature
American literature, including:
 African American literature
 Jewish American literature
 Southern literature
 Australian literature
 British literature (literature from some regions of the United Kingdom may be written in Celtic languages)
 Canadian literature (a significant amount of Canadian literature is also written in French)
 Irish literature
 New Zealand literature
 Scottish literature
 Welsh literature
 South African literature (excluding works written in other languages)
Indian English literature

English major
The English Major (alternatively "English concentration," "B.A. in English") is a term in the United States and several other countries for an undergraduate university degree focused around reading, analyzing, and writing texts in the English language. The term may also be used to describe a student who is pursuing such a degree.

Students who major in English reflect upon, analyze, and interpret literature and film. Although help-wanted postings rarely solicit English majors specifically, graduates with English degrees can seek careers in creative writing, education and law. A degree in English also helps to develop the needed critical thinking skills essential to a number of career fields, including writing, editing, publishing, teaching, research, advertising, public relations, law, and finance.

History
The history of English studies at the modern university in Europe and America begins in the second half of the nineteenth century. Initially, English studies comprised a motley array of content: the practice of oratory, the study of rhetoric and grammar, the composition of poetry, and the appreciation of literature (mostly by authors from England, since American literature and language study was only added in the twentieth century). In Germany and several other European countries, English philology, a strongly positivistic and historically interested practice of reading pre-modern texts, became the preferred scholarly paradigm, but English-speaking countries distanced themselves from philological paradigms soon after World War I. At the end of this process, English departments tended to refocus their work on various forms of writing instruction (creative, professional, critical) and the interpreting of literary texts, and teacher education in English recovered from the neglect it had suffered because of more science-oriented paradigms. Today, English departments in native-speaking countries re-evaluate their roles as sole guardians of the discipline because English is less and less native speakers' unique "property" and has to be shared with the millions of speakers and writers from other countries for whom English is an essential means of communication and artistic expression.

English literature became an object of study in French universities as part of foreign (comparative) literature in the nineteenth century. A chair of foreign literature was established at the College de France in 1841. English was first taught independently from other languages and literature in the University of Lille and in the University of Lyons and only afterwards in the Sorbonne. These three universities were the first major centres of English studies in France. The first lecturer and later professor of English studies would seem to have been Auguste Angellier. After spending several years teaching French in England in the 1860s and 1870s, he became a lecturer in English studies at the University of Lille in 1881 and a professor of English in 1893. In France nowadays, literature, civilisation, linguistics and the spoken and written language are all important in English studies in universities.

The English major rose to prominence in American colleges during the first half of the 1970s. It provided an opportunity for students to develop critical skills in analytical reading with the aim of improving their writing. It also focused on exercises in rhetoric and persuasive expression that had been traditionally only taught in classical studies and available to the very few due to language barriers and a shortage of professors who could actively engage students in the humanities. Outside the United States (originating in Scotland and then rippling out into the English-speaking world) the English major became popular in the latter half of the 19th century during a time when religious beliefs were shaken in the face of scientific discoveries. Literature was thought to act as a replacement for religion in the retention and advancement of culture, and the English Major thus provided students with the chance to draw moral, ethical, and philosophical qualities and meanings of older studies from a richer and broader source of literature than that of the ancient Greek and Latin classics.

Since 2000, there have been questions about the specific function of English departments at the contemporary U.S. college and university. The absence of a clearly defined disciplinary identity and the increasingly utilitarian goals in U.S. society present a challenge to those academic units still mostly focusing on the printed book and the traditional division in historical periods and national literatures, and neglecting allegedly non-theoretical areas such as professional writing, composition, and multimodal communication.

Skills acquired 

In the past, an academic degree in English usually meant an intensive study of British and American literary masterpieces. Now, however, an English Major encompasses a much broader range of topics which stretch over multiple disciplines. While the requirements for an English Major vary from university to university, most English departments emphasize three core skills: analyzing literature, a process which requires logic and reflective analysis; creativity and imagination with regard to the production of good writing; and an understanding of different cultures, civilizations, and literary styles from various time periods.  Prospective English Majors can expect to take college courses in academic writing, creative writing, literary theory, British and American literature, multicultural literature, several literary genres (such as poetry, drama, and film studies), and a number of elective multidisciplinary topics such as history, courses in the social sciences, and studies in a foreign language. To the end of studying these disciplines, many degree programs also offer training in professional writing with relations to rhetoric, literary analysis, an appreciation for the diversity of cultures, and an ability to clearly and persuasively express their ideas in writing.

Examples of courses 

Most English courses fall into the broader categories of either Literature-based studies, which focus on classical authors and time periods, or Rhetorical studies, which concentrate on communication skills in preparation for specialization in a variety of professional fields. While specific graduation requirements vary from university to university, students can expect to study some of the following courses.

Courses in Writing and Composition: such as Academic and Professional Writing, which stress analytical writing and train students to produce clear, cohesive arguments.

Courses in British literature: Courses may focus on time periods, authors, genres, or literary movements. Examples include Shakespeare's Tragedies, History and Theory of British Drama, Medieval English Literature, and the Victorian Novel.

Courses in American literature: Depending upon the university, these courses can either be broken down by time period, such as Nineteenth Century Gothic Fiction; authors, such as classes on Hawthorne, Hemingway, or Frost; or Literary schools and movements, such as Naturalism or Transcendentalism.

Courses in Multicultural Literature: The value of bringing a range of cultural and multidisciplinary perspectives to the study of English literature is being increasingly recognized in a number of universities. Examples include Multi-cultural Literatures in Medieval England, Latina Narratives, and Studies in Jewish Literature.

Rhetorical courses: Focus on techniques of persuasive arguing in the written form, as well as skills which involve the analysis of written texts.

Career opportunities 

A major in English opens a variety of career opportunities for college graduates entering the job market. Since students who graduate with an English degree are trained to ask probing questions about large bodies of texts and then to formulate, analyze, and answer those questions in coherent, persuasive prose—skills vital to any number of careers—English majors have much to choose from after graduation. The most obvious career choices for English majors are writing, publishing, journalism, human resources specialist, and teaching. However, other less intuitive job options include positions in advertising, public relations, acting, law, business, marketing, information assurance, and directing.

At High School

Britain
Most British children take English Language and English Literature as GCSE / National 5 or subjects, and many go on to study these at A Level / Higher and Advanced Higher. There continues to be debate within the teaching community regarding the relevance of Shakespeare for contemporary teens, some arguing for more modern texts, and some upholding the virtues of the classics. See also O Level.

Ontario, Canada 
Students in high school have specific course requirements they must meet before they can graduate. In regards to English studies, students must take four full credits in English, one in each grade level. As well, Ontario high school students must also pass a Literacy test.

America 
In typical American high schools, students in grades 9-12 learn how to read critically and objectively. Students are asked to draw connections from the texts they are assigned with ideas discussed in class. They are also taught how to analyze fiction and nonfiction works and answer questions using citations from the texts. Overall, most high school English programs follow the Common Core Standards, which require students to meet objectives in reading, writing, speaking and listening.

See also
American Literature (academic discipline)
Literati
English as a second language
Academic English
Literary Research Guide

References

O'Hara, Shelly. What Can You Do with a Major in English. Hoboken: Wiley Publishing Inc., 2005. 
The University of Chicago Courses and Programs of Study The College 2006–2008. 
de Vane, William Clyde. The English Major. College English, Vol. 3, No. 1 (Oct., 1941), pp. 47–52 
On the History of the English Major,

Further reading 
 The End of the English Major

External links 
 European Society for the Study of English (ESSE)
 International Society for the Linguistics of English (ISLE)
 Association of Departments of English in the US and Canada
 Conference on College Composition and Communication
 International English Honour Society
 Modern Language Association (MLA)
 Professional organizations Related to the MLA

English language
English-language literature
Literary criticism
Literary theory
Literary education
English-language culture
Academic disciplines